This is a list of mountains on Mars by elevation, the vertical position relative to the areoid, which is the Martian vertical datum (the surface defined as zero elevation by average martian atmospheric pressure and planet radius).  Elevation is not the height above the surrounding terrain (topographic prominence).

A mons (plural montes) is a term used in astrogeology to name extraterrestrial mountains and may or may not be of volcanic origin.
A patera refers to the dish-shaped depression atop a volcano that is not very high compared to its diameter.
A tholus (pl. tholi) is the term used in astrogeology to describe a small domical mountain or hill.
Listed mons elevation is the highest point (at 16 pixels/degree) within the feature.
Listed patera elevation is the average elevation of the shallow dish-shaped depression (the actual 'patera') at the summit.

Notable extreme elevations on Earth and Venus are included (in bold and Italics) for comparison, where the given elevations are relative to mean sea level.

See also
 List of craters on Mars
 List of extraterrestrial volcanoes
 List of mountains on Mars
 List of tallest mountains in the Solar System
 Volcanism on Mars

References

 United States Geological Survey data files megt90n000eb.img and megt90n000eb.lbl

External links
Olympus Mons, Arsia Mons, Alba Patera: Viking Orbiter Views of Mars by the Viking Orbiter Imaging Team.
Ascraeus Mons: Malin Space Science Systems Release No. MOC2-950 via the Mars Global Surveyor.
Pavonis Mons: Malin Space Science Systems Release No. MOC2-481 via the Mars Global Surveyor.
Elysium Mons: Malin Space Science Systems via the Mars Global Surveyor.

Mars, by height
 
Highest things